Hubballi Railway Division is one of the three railway divisions under South Western Railway zone of Indian Railways. This railway division was formed on 5 November 1951 and its headquarter is located at Hubballi in the state of Karnataka of India.

Bengaluru railway division and Mysuru railway division are the other railway divisions under SWR Zone headquartered at Hubballi.

Sections
 Gadag Junction–Hotgi Junction section
 Hubballi - Ankola Section (Under Proposal - Construction)
 Guntakal–Vasco da Gama section
 Miraj–Londa section
 Bellary Junction–Chikkajajur Junction section
 Toranagallu Junction-Ranjitpura section
 Bagalkot Junction–Kudachi section
 Gadag Junction–Wadi Junction section
 Ginigera Junction–Raichur Junction section
 Hospet Junction–Amaravati colony Junction section
 Gunda Road Junction–Swamihalli section
 Rayadurg–Tumkur section
 Gadag Junction–Yalvigi section
 Mahabubnagar-Munirabad section

List of railway stations and towns 
The list includes the stations under the Hubballi railway division and their station category.

Stations closed for Passengers -

References

 
Divisions of Indian Railways
1951 establishments in Mysore State